Neuropteris is an extinct seed fern that existed in the Carboniferous period, known only from fossils.

Major species include Neuropteris loschi.

See also
Coal forest
Macroneuropteris

References 

Pteridospermatophyta
Pennsylvanian plants
Prehistoric plant genera
Carboniferous first appearances
Carboniferous extinctions
Fossils of Georgia (U.S. state)
Paleozoic life of New Brunswick
Paleozoic life of Nova Scotia
Paleozoic life of Prince Edward Island
Prehistoric plants of North America